Anthony Ladd (born December 23, 1973) is a former American football wide receiver who played one season for the New England Patriots. He also played in NFL Europe and in the Arena Football League.

Early life
Anthony Ladd was born on December 23, 1973 in Homestead, Florida. He went to high school at Homestead (FL).

College career
He went to college at Cincinnati. In 1993 he had 10 catches for 170 yards. In 1994 he had 35 catches for 446 yards and 3 touchdowns. The next year he had 34 catches for 433 yards and three touchdowns. He also had one rush for 5 yards. His final year of college he had 21 catches for 409 yards and three touchdowns.

Career statistics

Professional career

Barcelona Dragons
In 1998 he played for the Barcelona Dragons of the NFL Europe. He had 8 catches for 139 yards.

New England Patriots
Later in the year he played for the New England Patriots. He played in 3 games but had no statistics.

Berlin Thunder
In 2000, he played for the Berlin Thunder. He played in 10 games and had 19 catches for 238 yards and three touchdowns.

Chicago Rush
In 2001, he played for the Chicago Rush of the Arena Football League. He played in 3 games and had 8 catches for 87 yards. He also had three touchdowns. In 2002 he played for them and had 41 catches for 449 yards and 13 touchdowns. He also had 4 rushes for 2 yards and a touchdown. The next year he had 33 catches for 402 yards and 11 touchdowns. He also had 2 rushing touchdowns. He even had 2 interceptions on defense. His final season was 2004, where he played for 3 teams. With the Rush, he had 8 catches for 65 yards and 2 touchdowns.

Dallas Desperado
His second team of 2004 was the Dallas Desperados. With them he had 4 catches for 31 yards.

Las Vegas Gladiators
His final team was the Las Vegas Gladiators. He had 3 catches for 36 yards with them.

Career Stats

Receiving and Rushing

References

1973 births
Living people
New England Patriots players
American football wide receivers
Cincinnati Bearcats football players
Barcelona Dragons players
Berlin Thunder players
Chicago Rush players
Dallas Desperados players
Las Vegas Gladiators players
People from Homestead, Florida
Homestead High School (Homestead, Florida) alumni
Players of American football from Florida
Fellows of the American Physical Society